Richard Hunt may refer to:

Arts and entertainment
 Richard Hunt (artist) (born 1951), Canadian carver and artist
 Richard Hunt (pianist) (1930–2011), Canadian pianist and composer
 Richard Hunt (sculptor) (born 1935), American sculptor
 Richard Howland Hunt (1862–1931), American architect and son of Richard Morris Hunt
 Richard Morris Hunt (1827–1895), American architect
 Richard Hunt (puppeteer) (1951–1992), puppeteer who performed a number of the Muppets

Politics
 Richard Hunt (politician) (1832–1915), politician in Nova Scotia, Canada
 Richard Hunt (MP), MP for Orford beginning in 1529
 Richard Harte or Hunt (died 1616), MP for Nottingham

Other
 Richard Allen Hunt (1937–2009), American mathematician
 Sir Tim Hunt (Richard Timothy Hunt, born 1943), English biochemist
 Richard William Hunt (1908–1979), English editor, medieval historian, palaeographer
 Richard Hunt (editor) (1933–2012), English editor of environmentalist magazines Green Anarchist and Alternative Green
 Richard Hunt (priest) (1596–1661), English clergy indirectly associated with Shakespeare authorship dispute
 Richard Hunt (Dean of Durham) (died 1638), English clergy, Dean of Durham 1620–1638
 Richard W. Hunt (born c. 1952), U.S. Navy admiral
 Richard Hunt, American colonial militia officer targeted by Hunt-Swartout raid (1756) during French and Indian War
 Dick Hunt (baseball) (1847–1895), American baseball player
 Dick Hunt (speed skater) (born 1935), American speed skater

See also
 Richard Hunter (disambiguation)